Mechelen RFC is a Belgian rugby club in Mechelen.

External links
 Mechelen RFC

Belgian rugby union clubs
Sport in Mechelen